Ronald McDonald Sinclair (born 19 November 1964) is a Scottish former professional footballer who played as a goalkeeper.

As a player he made 275 league and cup appearances in a 16-year professional career in the English Football League with Nottingham Forest, Leeds United, Bristol City, Stoke City and Chester City, as well as spells on loan with Wrexham, Derby County, Sheffield United, Halifax Town, Walsall and Bradford City. He won promotion out of the Third Division with Bristol City in 1989–90 and out of the Second Division with Stoke City in 1992–93, and was voted as Chester City's Player of the Season for 1996–97. He later went on to coach at Stoke City, Aston Villa and Port Vale.

Playing career
Capped by Scotland at youth and schoolboy level, Sinclair joined Nottingham Forest as an apprentice from Stirling Boys Club and he signed professional forms in October 1982. However he failed to make a first-team appearance for the City Ground club and it was in a loan spell with Fourth Division side Wrexham in the closing stages of the 1983–84 season that Sinclair gained his first Football League action. Over the following two seasons he spent time on loan with Derby County, Sheffield United and Leeds United without making the first-team, but he was snapped up on a permanent basis by Leeds in June 1986 for £10,000. He made eight league appearances the following season before twice joining Halifax Town on loan.

In September 1989 Sinclair moved to Bristol City, who he helped win promotion from Third Division in his first season at Ashton Gate. By the early stages of the 1991–92 campaign he was out on loan again though, spending time with Walsall before beginning a five-year stay with Stoke City in a £25,000 move in November 1991. Sinclair faced regular competition for the goalkeeper's shirt with Stoke but played more than 20 games in his first three seasons at the club.

After falling out of favour, Sinclair joined Chester City on a free transfer in August 1996. After conceding just 43 goals in 1996–97, Chester qualified for the Third Division play-offs with Sinclair voted the club's Player of the Season. The Blues lost to Swansea City in the semi-finals and the following season saw Sinclair miss 13 league games following the emergence of Wayne Brown. He was not selected again after a 5–0 thrashing at Exeter City on 4 April 1998 and manager Kevin Ratcliffe announced later in the month that Sinclair's contract would not be renewed. He later played four Northern Premier League Premier Division games for Leek Town, before signing with Witton Albion in December 1999 after manager Nigel Gleghorn looked to rest first-choice goalkeeper Phil McGing. He made his debut for Witton on 4 December 1999 and made 15 appearances as the club finished third in the Northern Premier League Division One at the end of the 1999–2000 season, missing out on promotion and the league title on goal difference.

Coaching career
Sinclair never played professionally again after leaving Chester and has spent most of his time working as goalkeeping coach with Stoke City, where he initially was registered again as a player. He became the assistant academy manager, before moving to become the academy goalkeeping coach at Aston Villa. He was appointed as goalkeeping coach at Port Vale by manager Neil Aspin in December 2017.

Career statistics

A.  The "Other" column constitutes appearances and goals in the Anglo-Italian Cup, Football League Trophy, Football League play-offs and Full Members Cup.

Honours
Bristol City
 Football League Third Division second-place promotion: 1989–90

Stoke City
 Football League Second Division: 1992–93

Individual
 Chester City F.C. Player of the Season: 1996–97

References

1964 births
Living people
Footballers from Stirling
Scottish footballers
Association football goalkeepers
Nottingham Forest F.C. players
Wrexham A.F.C. players
Derby County F.C. players
Sheffield United F.C. players
Leeds United F.C. players
Halifax Town A.F.C. players
Bristol City F.C. players
Walsall F.C. players
Stoke City F.C. players
Bradford City A.F.C. players
Chester City F.C. players
Leek Town F.C. players
Witton Albion F.C. players
English Football League players
Northern Premier League players
Association football coaches
Association football goalkeeping coaches
Stoke City F.C. non-playing staff
Aston Villa F.C. non-playing staff
Port Vale F.C. non-playing staff